The Chalfant Petroglyph Site, also known as CA-MNO-7, is a  archeological site in the Chalfant Valley volcanic tablelands, above Bishop in Mono County, eastern California.

The petroglyphs and archaeological site were listed on the National Register of Historic Places in 2000.

See also
Coso Rock Art District
Northern Paiute

References 

Petroglyphs in California
Paiute
History of Mono County, California
Archaeological sites on the National Register of Historic Places in California
National Register of Historic Places in Mono County, California